Mulona grisea is a moth of the subfamily Arctiinae first described by George Hampson in 1900. It is found on Jamaica.

References

Moths described in 1900
Lithosiini